Stenanthemum radiatum is a species of flowering plant in the family Rhamnaceae and is endemic to a restricted part of the southwest of Western Australia. It is a spreading shrub with narrowly triangular or wedge-shaped to heart-shaped leaves and densely crowded, head-like clusters  of white, densely hairy, tube-shaped flowers.

Description
Most leaves have a deeply notched tip, the edges of the leaves is rolled under, and the lower surface is hairy. The clusters are surrounded by two or more radiating leaves, giving the clusters a daisy-like appearance.

Taxonomy and naming
Stenanthemum radiatum was first formally described in 2007 by Barbara Lynette Rye in the journal Nuytsia from specimens collected in 1998 in the Burma Road Nature Reserve. The specific epithet (radiatum) means "with spokes" or "radiating", referring to the arrangement of the leaves around the flower clusters.

Distribution and habitat
This species is only known from the Burma Road Nature Reserve where it grows on laterite with species of Calothamnus, Hakea and Allocasuarina in the Geraldton Sandplains bioregion of south-western Western Australia.

Conservation status
Stenanthemum radiatum is listed as "Priority Two" by the Western Australian Government Department of Biodiversity, Conservation and Attractions, meaning that it is poorly known and from only one or a few locations.

References

radiatum
Rosales of Australia
Flora of Western Australia
Plants described in 2007
Taxa named by Barbara Lynette Rye